The Cypher Systems Group Greenway (formerly Amherstburg–Essex Greenway) is a  rail trail along a former CN Rail spur line in the town of Essex, Ontario, Canada. , the trail extends from Sadler's Park in Essex towards Amherstburg. CN Rail had donated this spur line in 1997, following the donation of its other subdivision, which is now the Chrysler Canada Greenway, in 1993, to ERCA, which manages the trail. ERCA has stated they intended on linking to the Chrysler Canada Greenway and Amherstburg when funds become available, which was finally realized in the summer of 2017.

External links 
 Map of ERCA's outdoor recreation sites
 ERCA map showing location of the trails

Rail trails in Ontario
Transport in Essex County, Ontario
Protected areas of Essex County, Ontario